Tingeltangel is a 1922 German silent film directed by Otto Rippert and starring Gisela Schönfeld, Friedrich Kühne and Hans Heinrich von Twardowski.

The film's art direction was by Gustav A. Knauer.

Cast
 Gisela Schönfeld as Mimi  
Friedrich Kühne as Pat Handfour  
 Hans Heinrich von Twardowski as Frank  
 Arnold Korff as John Sventrop 
 Emil Albes 
 Wilhelm Bendow 
 Carl Bernhardt 
 Hugo Döblin 
Carl Geppert 
 Charlotte Hagenbruch 
 Magda Madeleine 
 Jenny Marba 
 Hermann Picha 
 Tzwetta Tzatschewa

References

Bibliography
 Margot Pehle & Heidi Westhoff. Hätte ich das Kino!. 1976.

External links

1922 films
Films of the Weimar Republic
Films directed by Otto Rippert
German silent feature films
Terra Film films
German black-and-white films